Park Tae-soo (Hangul: 박태수; Hanja: 朴太洙; Revised Romanization: Bak Taesu; born 1 December 1989), also known as 'Karim', among his teammates is a South Korean professional footballer who plays as a centre back or defensive midfielder for Malaysia Super League club Sabah F.C.

He became well known when his free-kick goal against P.J. City went viral on social media. FIFA, the world football governing body, also shared a clip of the goal on its Twitter page.

Personal life 
Park was born in Incheon and spent his adolescence there. He attended Anyang Middle School and Anyang Technical High School. He later attended Hongik University before starting his football senior career with Incheon United in 2011.

According to his social media account in Instagram, Park was married to a Korean woman in 2014 and has two children.

The family currently lives in Kota Kinabalu in Sabah, Malaysia.

Club career
Park, a draftee from the 2011 K-League draft intake, was selected by Incheon United for the 2011 season, and his first appearance for his new club was in a K-League Cup match against Daejeon Citizen, playing nearly the entire second half of the match. His debut in the K-League was as a late substitute in Incheon's match against Gwangju FC on 22 May 2011.

Sabah
On 29 January 2019, Park was signed by the Malaysian Premier League club Sabah FA as their sole import defender player. Park scored an equaliser goal during one of the team's early matches against Terengganu F.C. II before the team sealed victory with two more goals scored by his fellow teammates. During his career with the team, he has shown excellent defensive work to withstand pressure from opponent teams that resulted in Sabah securing top place in the 2019 Malaysia Premier League, thus qualifying for the 2020 Malaysia Super League.

Club career statistics

Honours 
Sabah

 Malaysia Premier League: 2019

References

External links

1989 births
Living people
People from Incheon
Sportspeople from Incheon
South Korean footballers
Chungju Hummel FC players
Incheon United FC players
Daejeon Hana Citizen FC players
FC Anyang players
Sabah F.C. (Malaysia) players
K League 1 players
K League 2 players
Hongik University alumni
Association football defenders